A hammer drill, also known as a percussion drill or impact drill, is a power tool used chiefly for drilling in hard materials. It is a type of rotary drill with an impact mechanism that generates a hammering motion. The percussive mechanism provides a rapid succession of short hammer thrusts to pulverize the material to be bored, so as to provide quicker drilling with less effort. If a hammer drill's impact mechanism can be switched off, the tool can be used like a conventional drill to also perform tasks such as screwdriving.

Function
Hammer drills have a cam-action or percussion hammering mechanism, in which two sets of toothed gears mechanically interact with each other to hammer while rotating the drill bit. With cam-action drills, the chuck has a mechanism whereby the entire chuck and bit move forward and backward on the axis of rotation. This type of drill is often used with or without the hammer action, but it is not possible to use the hammer action alone as it is the rotation over the cams which causes the hammer motion. A hammer drill has a specially designed clutch that allows it to not only spin the drill bit, but also to punch it in and out (along the axis of the bit). The actual distance the bit travels in and out and the force of its blow are both very small, and the hammering action is very rapid—thousands of "BPM" (blows per minute) or "IPM" (impacts per minute). Although each blow is of relatively low force, these thousands of blows per minute are more than adequate to break up concrete or brick, using the masonry drill bit's carbide wedge to pulverize it for the spiral flutes to whisk away. For this reason, a hammer drill drills much faster than a regular drill through concrete or brick. Hammer drills are increasingly powered by cordless technology.

Use
Holes in hard materials are needed for anchor bolts, concrete screws and wall plugs. Hammer drills are not typically used for production construction drilling, but rather for occasional drilling of holes into concrete, masonry or stone. They are also used to drill holes in concrete footings to pin concrete wall forms and to drill holes in concrete floors to pin wall framing. Hammer drills almost always have a lever or switch that locks off the special "hammer clutch," turning the tool into a conventional drill for wood or metal work. Hammer drills are more expensive and more bulky than regular drills, but are preferable for applications where the material to be drilled—concrete block or wood studs—is unknown.  For example, an electrician mounting an electrical box to a wall would be able to use the same hammer drill to drill into either wood studs (hammer disabled) or masonry walls (hammer enabled).

History
Ancient China's principal drilling technique, percussive drilling, was invented during the Han dynasty. The process involved two to six men jumping on a level at rhythmic intervals to raise a heavy iron bit attached to long bamboo cables from a bamboo derrick. The construction of large wells took more than two to three generations of workers to complete. The cable tool drilling machines developed by the early Chinese involved raising and dropping a heavy string of drilling tools to crush through rocks into diminutive fragments. The raising and dropping of the bamboo drill strings allowed the drilling machine to penetrate less dense and unconsolidated rock formations.

The origin of the first hammer drill is a matter of contention. German company Bosch produced the first "Bosch-Hammer" around 1932 in mass production. The US company Milwaukee Electric Tool Corporation states that in 1935, it was selling a lightweight  electric hammer drill (cam-action).

Hand-cranked percussion drills were made in the UK in the mid-twentieth century.

See also
Drill
Rotary hammer

References

External links
NIOSH Sound Power and Vibrations Database 
New York City Quiet Vendor Guidelines 

Power tools
Hand-held power tools